The 2007–08 Moldovan National Division was the 17th season of top-tier football in Moldova. The season started on 4 July 2007.

Overview
FC Sheriff Tiraspol won the league for the eighth consecutive season. The champions also qualified for the 2009 Commonwealth of Independent States Cup.

Rapid Ghidighici withdrew from the league in November after the conclusion of round 16.

League standings

Results
The schedule consists of three rounds. During the first two rounds, each team played each other once home and away for a total of 20 matches. The pairings of the third round were then set according to the standings after the first two rounds, giving every team a third game against each opponent for a total of 30 games per team.

First and second round

Third round

Top goalscorers

External links 
 soccerway 
 Pagină oficială 
 Divizia Nationala 

Moldovan Super Liga seasons
1
Moldova